John Plummer Derwent Lloyd (also commonly referred as J. P. D. Lloyd and Rev. Derwent Llwyd; June 7, 1861 – February 22, 1933) was an Episcopal cleric bearing the title of the Reverend who served in a number of churches across the United States and Canada. Of English descent, Lloyd worked at or rectored churches in Indiana, Wisconsin, Illinois, Nebraska, and Washington, and was the Episcopal Dean of Nova Scotia. Lloyd was an active resident of Seattle, Washington, inspiring public movements and taking part in the city's intellectual development through the presidency of the Public Library board of trustees. Under his supervision, the Seattle St. Mark's church and its premises were renewed and improved, and the number of people in the congregation considerably increased. In Halifax, Nova Scotia, Lloyd was a rector of the All Saints Church. He was a Halifax Explosion survivor, and during the tragedy actively participated in search and rescue missions, closely worked with the city's authorities and consoled the victims.

Early life and family

John Plummer Derwent Lloyd was born on June 7, 1861, in Manchester, England. He was the eldest child of the Reverend Thomas Lloyd, a Welsh descendant and a clergyman in the Church of England, and Emma Lloyd (Plummer). Both of them were also born in Manchester.

Lloyd spent part of his childhood with his grandparents in Derwent, Derbyshire. In 1874, his parents decided to move to Canada. There, John's father worked as rector of St. James' church in Gravenhurst, Ontario. Later, the elder Lloyd was an incumbent of the parish of Huntsville, Ontario, and an archdeacon of the Diocese of Algoma.

Education and first jobs

At the age of ten, Lloyd went to the Royal Lancasterian Grammar School in Manchester, one of the famous English preparatory schools, and spent three years there. After the family moved to Canada, he was tutored by the Reverend Joseph S. Cole for four years.

Lloyd studied at Trinity College in Toronto, the University of Toronto, and the Oxford and Berlin Universities. Lloyd's first job was a teacher in the schools of Ontario, Canada, where he worked for three years. Later, he moved to Toronto and worked in merchandising for another three years.

In 1883, Lloyd decided to start his career in the ministry. He entered the Episcopal Theological college at McGill University in Montreal, Canada, where he studied for one year. His second year Lloyd spent studying and working in St. George's Parish, New York, being tutored by the Reverend W. S. Rainsford.

Career

Beginning of his career 

In 1884, Lloyd was ordained to the deaconate, and the following year to the priesthood, by Indiana bishop David Buel Knickerbacker. Later, he spent two years in missionary work in Indiana and Wisconsin, including being a curate at All Saints Church in Milwaukee. In 1887–1889, he was invited to be the rector of St. Paul's Church in Riverside, a suburb of Chicago.

In 1889, after leaving St. Paul's, Lloyd became a rector in the Church of the Good Shepherd in Omaha, Nebraska, and stayed there for eight years.

Life and career in Seattle, Washington

In September 1897, Lloyd came to Seattle as a rector at St. Mark's Church, succeeding David Claiborne Garrett.

Under Lloyd's management, the church was extended and renewed, new lands were acquired, a new organ was purchased, and a rectory, appraised at $6,200 dollars ($163,000 in 2020 dollars) was built. During the six years of changes and development, the value of the church's property increased from $15,000 to, conservatively estimated, $60,000 (from $395,000 to $1,580,000).

Besides all of the improvements, Lloyd's other aim was to popularize the church and spirituality. During the six years of his rectorship, the congregation increased from 500 to more than 1,000, making St. Mark's the leading Episcopal church on the Pacific coast.

In 1908, Lloyd became a part of the Emmanuel Movement, a new system of healing adopted by Seattle Episcopal clergy. Lloyd was elected a chairman in the related organization, aimed at the discussion, study, and launch of the new system.

Lloyd succeeded as a lecturer and speaker on various subjects and occasions, and was an inspiration for many public movements. Aside from his ministerial position, he was president of the Board of Trustees for the Seattle Public Library. After the library was destroyed by fire in 1901, Lloyd became chairman of the building committee for the new construction. The new library couldn't be finished due to various obstacles and the lack of funds, and Lloyd played a key role in soliciting an additional $20,000 ($529,000) from Andrew Carnegie, a Scottish-American industrialist and philanthropist. 

During his time in Seattle, Lloyd was a member of the Episcopal Diocese of Olympia. As its clerical delegate, he attended the convention of the Protestant Episcopal church in Richmond, Virginia.

Lloyd resigned from St. Mark's Church in 1909. The congregation remained without a leader for four months, until on January 2, 1910, Ernest Vincent Shayler took Lloyd's place.

Later career

From 1909 to 1912, Lloyd served as the vice-provost of Trinity University, Toronto. In 1913, he came to Halifax, Nova Scotia, where he worked as rector and dean of All Saints Cathedral. He remained the Episcopal Dean of Nova Scotia until his death.

Lloyd's other later positions included: deputy to the General Convention of the Episcopal Church in the United States of America (which he occupied twice), and clerical deputy from the Nova Scotia diocese to the General Synod of the Church of England in Canada.

Memberships in clubs and organizations

In the course of his life, Lloyd was a member of a number of fraternity organizations, including the Masons, the Knights of Pythias, the Ancient Order of United Workmen, the Elks, and the Odd Fellows. He was decorated a knight by the King of Italy.

He was one of the founders of the University Club of Seattle, a social organization for the graduates of recognized Seattle colleges and universities established in 1900, and the president of the Monday Club. He worked as a director and twice as president of the Seattle Charity Organization Society (also called Associated Charities) from 1897 to 1899, and was a member of the American Archaeological Society.

Halifax Explosion of 1917

The Halifax Explosion took place on December 6, 1917, in Halifax, Nova Scotia, and was called the most ruinous explosion caused by humans prior to Hiroshima. The death toll exceeded 2,000, and over 9,000 were injured, including hundreds permanently blinded. Over 20,000 people lost their homes, savings, and possessions.

At the time of the explosion, Lloyd was reading the Morning Prayer in the chapel of All Saint's Cathedral, accompanied by his wife and two other women of his congregation. They felt trembling and, seconds later, the explosion. Lloyd described his feelings at that moment in a letter, saying he thought it was "a German shell" and he felt "a sensation of utter powerlessness." The wave shattered glass windows and ripped the solid oak doors from the hinges. After the service, Lloyd decided to head downtown in case someone needed his assistance. After hearing witness accounts of the scale of the tragedy, Lloyd rode to the heart of the devastated area.

Lloyd assisted the wounded and advised officers regarding the disposal of the deceased. He worked on search and rescue for four hours straight, and then met with the city authorities to discuss options on where to place the temporary mortuary. After a brief stop at home to change, he headed to Camp Hill Hospital to provide comfort to victims there and listen to what they had witnessed. In his letter, published the following year in Seattle Daily Times, Lloyd expressed admiration for Halifax authorities, citizens, and American people in general for their quick efficient reactions to the catastrophe.

Incidents and controversies

In Seattle, Lloyd's family lived in a rectory built during his management in St. Mark's church. In 1902, it was almost robbed during Lloyd and his wife's absence. When the parents returned home, a thief was discovered and cornered by Lloyd and his son in one of the rooms. However, the thief managed to escape through the window without taking anything.

In 1907, Lloyd refused to preside over the marriage of a 26-year-old woman and her Chinese groom, who had travelled from California to Washington to get married. In 1908, Lloyd initiated another dispute, when he pointed out the poor church attendance by the men of his congregation.

Personal life and death

Lloyd married Mary Emilie Thomas on December 28, 1886. She was born in Bradford, Ontario, and as a daughter of William H. Thomas and Adeline Thomas (Kissam), a descendant of aristocratic Knickerbocker families. The Lloyds had five children: Gwendolyn, Thomas, Adeline, Charlewood, and Margaret.

In 1933, Lloyd was hit by a car crossing the road and taken to Victoria General Hospital in Halifax. He suffered a broken leg and shock, but the doctors announced his condition was "comparatively good." He returned home after several weeks in the hospital, but suffered a heart attack shortly thereafter and died on February 22, 1933. The memorial service was held in St. Mark's Church in Seattle.

Publications

During his life, Lloyd published a number of magazine articles, a small volume of poems named The Song of the Breaker, a monograph of indigenous life called The Message of an Indian Relic, a dramatic poem titled The Vestal Virgin (1920), and severale books: Sonnet Sequence on the Spring (1925), Poems of Nature, Childhood, and Religion (1928); and a work named Son of Thunder: A Study of the Life and Work of John of Bethsaida (1932).

See also 
 St. Mark's Episcopal Cathedral, Seattle
 Halifax Explosion
 Dean of Nova Scotia
 All Saints Cathedral (Halifax, Nova Scotia)
 Emmanuel Movement 
 Andrew Carnegie

Notes

References

Literature cited

External links 
 J.P. Derwent Llwyd in the list of Rectors of Seattle Saint Mark's Parish
 

1861 births
1933 deaths
Clergy from Manchester
McGill University alumni
People from Seattle
Religious leaders from Washington (state)
American Episcopal priests
Anglican bishops of Nova Scotia and Prince Edward Island
Halifax Explosion survivors